Pirate Gold is a 1920 American adventure film serial directed by George B. Seitz. Seitz also directed a feature-length version of the serial, Rogues and Romance, released in December 1920. The 10-episode serial was re-edited into the feature-length film Rogues and Romance (1920). The serial is now considered a lost film.

Cast
 Marguerite Courtot as Gabrielle Hall
 George B. Seitz as Ivanhoe 'Hoey' Tuttle
 Frank Redman as Austin Tuttle
 William P. Burt as Tanner
 Joe Cuny as Kaidy
 Harry Stone as Constable Peabody
 Harry Semels as Siebert
 Matthew Betz as Harmon

List of episodes
In Which Hoey Buys a Map 
Dynamite 
The Dead Man's Story 
Treasure at Last 
Drugged 
Kidnapped 
Under Suspicion 
Knifed 
The Double Cross 
Defeat and Victory

See also
 List of film serials
 List of film serials by studio
 List of lost films

References

External links

1920 films
1920 lost films
1920 adventure films
American black-and-white films
Pirate films
American silent serial films
Films directed by George B. Seitz
Lost American films
American adventure films
Lost adventure films
1920s American films
Silent adventure films